Skreia is a village in Østre Toten Municipality in Innlandet county, Norway. In the summers, there is a ferry from Skreia across the lake to the town of Hamar.

Skreia was the terminus of Skreiabanen railway line. The now-abandoned railway line once ran between Reinsvoll and Skreia. The single track rail was a branch line from the main Gjøvik Line and it closed in 1987.

Skreia is located along County Road 33 which runs between Bjørgo in Nord-Aurdal and Minnesund in Eidsvoll. The Ostre Toten Cultural Center (Østre Toten kulturhus) is located in Skreia. The principal local industry is food production and the processing of potatoes and vegetables.

Notable residents 
Alv Gjestvang, speed skater
Inger Lise Rypdal, singer
Maj Britt Andersen, singer

Media gallery

References

Østre Toten
Villages in Innlandet